The California Academy of Sciences is a research institute and natural history museum in San Francisco, California, that is among the largest museums of natural history in the world, housing over 46 million specimens. The Academy began in 1853 as a learned society and still carries out a large amount of original research. The institution is located at the Golden Gate Park in San Francisco.

In early 2020, before the COVID-19 pandemic, the California Academy of Sciences had around 500 employees and an annual revenue of about $33 million.

Governance
The California Academy of Sciences, California's oldest operating museum and research institution for the natural sciences, is governed by a forty-one member Board of Trustees who are nominated and chosen by the California Academy of Sciences Fellows.  The Academy Fellows are, in turn, "[n]ominated by their colleagues and appointed by the Board of Trustees...the Fellows remain members of the Fellowship for life."  The Board of Trustees are then responsible for appointing the executive management of the Academy, who in turn are responsible for overseeing the Academy's overall operation and the hiring of its other managers and employees.

Institute for Biodiversity Science and Sustainability (IBSS)
Besides its function as source of public science education through its museum, the California Academy of Sciences also operates the Institute for Biodiversity Science and Sustainability (IBSS) as its research arm, conducting research in the fields of taxonomy, phylogenetics, and biodiversity studies.  Although one aspect of the IBSS is available for view by museum patrons at the science "project lab" exhibit, most of the research happens in laboratories and facilities "behind the scenes" and not observable by the public.  In fact, unbeknownst to most patrons, research and administrative facilities occupy nearly 50% of the Academy's physical structure.

Public Education

 
The main thrust of the exhibits is natural history. The venues of the museum include the following:
Kimball Natural History Museum - generally encompasses the entire museum outside the planetarium, rainforest, and aquarium, and includes Africa Hall (the Academy's oldest running exhibit), the East Wing (which includes a Foucault pendulum, also a carry-over exhibit from the older, pre-2008 renovation of the Academy), the West Wing (which  housed several geophysical exhibits), as well as several smaller exhibits distributed throughout the remainder of the Academy building.
Rainforests of the World - rainforest exhibit enclosed in a  glass dome.
Steinhart Aquarium - includes exhibits of coral reefs, tidepools, and swamp habitats.

Besides its museum programs, the California Academy of Sciences offers many educational and community outreach programs to members of the public at large.

Research
Academy scientists, under the Academy's Institute for Biodiversity Science and Sustainability, conduct systematic and conservation research in several different fields, including anthropology, marine biology, botany, entomology, herpetology, ichthyology, invertebrate zoology, mammalogy, ornithology, geology, and paleontology. There also is a strong emphasis on environmental concerns, with all the various departments collaborating closely to focus on systematic biology and biodiversity. Academy researchers study life around the world: a 2011 expedition to the Philippines discovered an estimated 300 species new to science. The Academy publishes the peer-reviewed journal Proceedings of the California Academy of Sciences, as well as Occasional Papers, Memoirs, and Special Publications.

History

Early years
The California Academy of Natural Sciences was founded in 1853, only three years after California joined the United States, becoming the first society of its kind in the Western US. Its stated aim was to undertake "a thorough systematic survey of every portion of the State and the collection of a cabinet of her rare and rich productions." It was renamed as the more inclusive California Academy of Sciences in 1868.

The Academy had a forward-thinking view towards women in science, passing a resolution in its first year of existence that the members "highly approve of the aid of females in every department of natural science, and invite their cooperation." This policy led to several women being hired into professional positions as botanists, entomologists, and other occupations during the 19th century, when opportunities for women in the sciences were limited, and often, those that existed were restricted to menial cataloging and calculation work.  In 1892, Alice Eastwood, a botanist, was hired by the Academy and worked there until she retired in 1949. She created the collection of rare plants, which was saved when the Academy was destroyed in the 1906 San Francisco earthquake

The Academy's first official museum opened in 1874 at the corner of California and Dupont Streets (now Grant Avenue) in what is now Chinatown, and drew up to 80,000 visitors a year. To accommodate its increasing popularity, the Academy moved to a new and larger building on Market Street in 1891, funded by the legacy of James Lick, a 19th-century San Francisco real estate mogul, entrepreneur, and philanthropist.

However, only fifteen years later, the Market Street facility fell victim to the 1906 San Francisco earthquake and three days of fire, which also wiped out all but a wheelbarrow full of the Academy's library and specimen collections. In the widespread destruction occurring in the aftermath of the quake, Academy curators and staffers only were able to retrieve a single cart of materials, including Academy minute books, membership records, and 2,000 type specimens. The 1905-1906 scientific collecting expedition to the Galápagos Islands (the first of several sponsored by the academy to the archipelago) already was underway, and it returned seven months later, providing replacement collections for those lost.

Golden Gate Park site
In 1916, the Academy moved to the North American Hall of Birds and Mammals in Golden Gate Park, the first building on the site that was to become its permanent home. In 1923, the Steinhart Aquarium was added, followed in 1934 by the Simson African Hall.

During World War II, the Academy contributed to the American war effort by using its workshop facilities to repair optical and navigational equipment for United States Navy ships; San Francisco was a major port for the Pacific War arena.

The post-war years saw a flurry of new construction on the site; the Science Hall was added in 1951, followed by the Morrison Planetarium in 1952. The Morrison Planetarium was the seventh major planetarium to open in the United States and featured a one-of-a-kind star projector, built by Academy staff members (in part using the expertise gained doing the optical work for the US Navy during World War II). The Academy Projector projected irregularly shaped stars, rather than the circular stars projected by many optical star projectors. The irregular shapes were created by placing variously sized grains of silicon carbide onto the glass star plates by hand, then aluminizing the plates, and brushing away the silicon carbide grains.

In 1959, the Malliard Library, Eastwood Hall of Botany, and Livermore Room all were added. Throughout the 1960s, universities concentrating on the new field of molecular biology divested themselves of their traditional specimen collections, entrusting them to the Academy and leading to a rapid growth of the Academy's holdings.

In 1969, another new building, Cowell Hall, was added to the site. In 1976, several new galleries were opened, and the following year, in 1977, the "fish roundabout" was constructed.

Prior to the old building being torn down in 2005, there was a Life through Time gallery, housing a large display on evolution and paleontology. There was a Gem and Mineral Hall, a section on Earthquakes, and a Gary Larson exhibit.

Earthquake damage and new building

The Academy buildings were damaged significantly in the 1989 Loma Prieta earthquake. Subsequently, the Bird Hall building was closed to ensure public safety. The inadequately engineered Steinhart Aquarium suffered dramatic seismic damage from the 1989 earthquake, as well.

As plans were made to repair the damage and make the buildings seismically stable, it was realized that a considerable amount of work would be needed to bring the buildings up to modern standards. This led to the idea of giving the Academy a complete overhaul, thus motivating the closing of the main site.

Construction began on the new $500 million building on September 12, 2005, while the exhibits were moved to 875 Howard Street for a temporary museum.

The Academy reopened with a free day on September 27, 2008. For most of the day the line for admittance was over a mile (nearly two kilometers) long, and although over 15,000 people were admitted, several thousands more had to be turned away.

In May 2020, during the COVID-19 pandemic, the Academy announced that it would lay off 105 of its then 504 employees, furlough 96 others, and enact pay cuts among part of the rest. Due to the COVID-19 lockdown's effect on ticket sales, the organization was expecting its revenue to decrease by around $12 million (36%), in the next fiscal year.

Environmental design of new building

The design architect for the museum replacement project was Renzo Piano. His design was awarded the Urban Land Institute (ULI) Award for Excellence for the Americas region in 2008, as well as the Holcim Award Silver for sustainable construction projects in the North America region in 2005.  One critic praised the building as a "blazingly uncynical embrace of the Enlightenment values of truth and reason", and a "comforting reminder of the civilizing function of great art in a barbaric age".

The new building emphasizes environmentally friendly design, in keeping with the Academy's focus on ecological concerns and environmental sustainability. It received Platinum certification under the LEED program. This project was featured on the Discovery Channel Extreme Engineering series in 2006, the National Geographic Channel Man-Made series in July 2008, and Smithsonian Channel's How Do They Build That? in August 2022.

The new building includes an array of environmentally friendly features:
Produces 50 percent less waste water than previously
Recycles rainwater for irrigation
Uses 60,000 photovoltaic cells
Supports a green roof with an area of 
Uses natural lighting in 90 percent of occupied spaces
Construction includes 11 million pounds (5,000 t) of recycled steel
Wall insulation made from scraps of recycled denim

Green roof
The California Academy of Science green roof has several environmentally friendly features, as well as sustainable design. Renzo Piano was inspired by seven major hills of San Francisco, which typically refers to: Telegraph Hill, Nob Hill, Russian Hill, Rincon Hill, Mount Sutro, Twin Peaks and Mount Davidson. The living green roof was planted with 1.7 million California native plants. The museum's central piazza lies beneath a massive glass ceiling in the roof, which opens to allow cool night air to flow into the building below; by using this kind of natural ventilation instead of air conditioning to regulate interior temperature, the building becomes more energy efficient. Renzo Piano and SWA Group won the American Society of Landscape Architects (ASLA) Award in design in 2009.

Gallery

See also

 49-Mile Scenic Drive
 Green museum

References

Further reading
 "Natural Phenomenon", by Matt Tyrnauer, Vanity Fair, May 2008
 Cutting Edge Construction—National Geographic Channel
 "Concrete and Strawberries", California magazine, September 2008
 "Beyond Green", California Home + Design, September 2008

External links
 
 
 
 Calacademy.org: PDFs on national media reports of Academy's construction
 California Academy of Sciences at Google Cultural Institute
 ASLA 2009 Design Award

 
1853 establishments in California
2000s architecture in the United States
Association of Science-Technology Centers member institutions
Buildings and structures burned in the 1906 San Francisco earthquake
Buildings and structures completed in 2008
Expressionist architecture
Futurist architecture
Golden Gate Park
Institutions accredited by the American Alliance of Museums
Museums in San Francisco
Natural history museums in California
Organizations established in 1853
Ove Arup buildings and structures
Planetaria in the United States
Postmodern architecture in California
Renzo Piano buildings
Science and technology in the San Francisco Bay Area
Science museums in California